Khoa Dinh Nguyen (born October 9, 1966) is an American table tennis player. He competed at the 2000 Summer Olympics and the 2004 Summer Olympics.

References

1966 births
Living people
American male table tennis players
Olympic table tennis players of the United States
Table tennis players at the 2000 Summer Olympics
Table tennis players at the 2004 Summer Olympics
People from Nha Trang
Pan American Games medalists in table tennis
Pan American Games gold medalists for the United States
Pan American Games silver medalists for the United States
Medalists at the 1987 Pan American Games
Table tennis players at the 1987 Pan American Games